Norman Shanks Kerr  (17 May 1834 – 30 May 1899) was a Scottish physician and social reformer who is remembered for his work in the British temperance movement. He originated the Total Abstinence Society and was founder and first president of the Society for the Study and Cure of Inebriety which was founded in 1884.

In his writings he insisted on regarding inebriety as a disease and not a vice: "a disease of the nervous system allied to insanity", an "abnormal condition, in which morbid cravings and impulses to intoxication are apt to be developed in such force as to overpower the moral resistance and control."

His influential textbook on "Inebriety or Narcomania" was first published in 1888 and went through three editions. In the first edition he coined the term "narcomania" to refer to the disease of inebriety. Note that while 'inebriate' originally described a person intoxicated with alcohol, it later came to include other intoxicating drugs, especially narcotics, such as opium, chlorodyne, ether, chloral, chloroform or cocaine.

He was elected a Fellow of the Linnean Society in 1873 and was also a member of the Obstetrical and Medical Societies of London, the Harveian Society and British Medical Association, being elected to the General Council for the Metropolitan branch.

Early life and education
Norman Shanks Kerr was born at Morrison's Court, Argyle Street, Glasgow, Scotland on 17 May 1834, the eldest son of Alexander Kerr (1800-1855) and Helen ( Shanks) Kerr (b. 1813). His father, Alexander, was a merchant and ship owner who lived at Florentine Bank House, Hillhead, and who died in 1855.

Norman Kerr studied at the Western Academy and the High School, then worked as a journalist on the Glasgow Mail before entering University, graduating from the University of Glasgow in 1861 as Doctor of Medicine (M.D.) and Master of Surgery (C.M.).

Even from these student days he was interested in the study of alcoholism; he was a member of the temperance Coffee Tavern Company of Glasgow and organised the first Total Abstinence Society for students in 1857. In 1853 he attended the inaugural meeting of the United Kingdom Alliance at Manchester and he was the first secretary of the Glasgow Abstainers' Union. In 1858 he was secretary for the non-political "The Independent Union" of students.

Career
After graduation he was resident surgeon at the Lock Hospital, Glasgow, and then employed as a surgeon on the Montreal Ocean Steamship Company for about nine years. In 1863 he gave an account of a tour in America, including Portland, New York, and other large towns, "and referred at some length to the great question of slavery". He is reported to have travelled in Canada and the United States in this time and to have visited Portland in 1864.

Dr Crothers notes in the first Norman Kerr lecture, "As a surgeon on shipboard he was known as a temperance doctor, and while not obtrusive or dogmatic in his views, he discouraged the use of spirits as a beverage."

He was then in practice in Markyate, Hertfordshire, being appointed Markyate Medical Officer in 1871, until he resigned in 1875. He took part in a local meeting in 1872 by the United Kingdom Alliance supporting Sir Wilfred Lawson's Permissive Prohibitory Bill.

He was elected a Fellow of the Linnean Society in 1873 with an interest in botany. In 1872 he wrote supporting the case for Eozoon canadense being recognised as a fossil.

Marylebone
From 1874, he was employed as the Medical Officer of Health for Marylebone (Christ Church District) by the Board of guardians. The Christ Church District included Lisson Grove, an area of slum housing with single room tenements. In 1881 the outbreak of Typhus prompted Dr Norman Kerr to write a letter to the Vestry of St Marylebone.

In a letter to the local paper he wrote "The Sanitary authority, typhus being at once the most contagious and the most preventable of diseases, ought to have suppressed the epidemic more than a month ago, and thus saved several lives. Had I not stepped in, at some detriment to health and private practice (keeping up only with the aid of professional assistance, constant Turkish baths, extra diet, and the non-use of stimulants) and discharged the duty the Vestry neglected, the cases would have numbered hundreds, and the deaths at least twenties."

The Turkish bath he visited is probably the one in Lisson Grove established in 1860, the first in London. His other health precaution was a good square meal before going where infectious disease existed. Dr Kerr also believed that "smoke being retained in the mouth has … a kind of disinfecting filter through which the germs have to pass, and some of them are certainly destroyed, or at least deprived of their vitality". "There might be exceptions, he said. If a person could not stand smoking well, then it might depress his heart's action, and so lessen the resisting power to throw off the infectious germs. On broad, general grounds, however, he was decidedly of opinion that tobacco smoking, other things being equal, did give anyone exposed to infection a considerable amount of immunity. Dr. Kerr himself in attending cases of cholera always made a point of smoking." He wrote on the subject of cholera and having had cholera himself.

Dr Kerr's health concerns were well founded since infectious diseases were common and in a previous outbreak nineteen years earlier the Relieving Officer and District Medical Officer both caught typhus and died. In this case he was able to joke about it, as reported by the Marylebone Mercury.

He went on to be one of the founders in 1892 of the Church Sanitary Association with the aims of ensuring to everyone pure air, pure water, a wholesome dwelling, and surroundings safeguarded from preventable diseases.

Temperance Movement
He promoted the temperance movement as a speaker and through his writings. After moving to London he joined the Church of England Temperance Society, speaking at their annual conference, and supported the British Women's Temperance Association.

He was a supporter of the Society for Promoting Legislation for the Control and Cure of Habitual Drunkards, which had been founded in 1876, and in 1877 read a paper on the treatment of habitual drunkards in the Psychological Section of a general meeting of the British Medical Association at Manchester. The Society drafted a bill to provide for one year detention of voluntary and criminal drunkards, with magistrates having the power to commit frequent offenders. This was withdrawn because of opposition to control by the prison inspectorate of the reformatories. The Habitual Drunkards' Act was passed in 1879 including protecting the drunkards' rights and his ability to pay for treatment. A habitual drunkard was defined as someone who "cannot be certified as a lunatic, but who due to habitual intemperate drinking is dangerous to him or herself or incapable of managing their affairs".  They could apply to two magistrates to voluntarily sign away their freedom and be sent to a Licensed Retreat for up to one year, but had to pay the charges themselves. The requirement to pay charges and the lack of compulsory detention for non-criminals was disappointing for the Society. When the British Medical Association created the Inebriates Legislation Committee to promote further legislation he was made the chairman. The committee drafted the Habitual Drunkards Act Amendment Bill (1888).

He was the Honorary Consulting Physician at the Dalrymple House for Inebriates, Rickmansworth, which had been founded in 1884 under the Inebriates Acts of 1879–99 for the clinical study and treatment of inebriety.

He promoted the use of Coffee Taverns and Coffee Music Halls as a temperance alternative and was a director of the Coffee Taverns Company and the Coffee Music Halls Company. In 1884 he chaired the informal meeting to celebrate Edward Payson Weston's temperance walk of 5000 miles in 100 days, excluding Sundays, at the Royal Victoria Coffee Hall, Lambeth.

He presided at the Colonial and International Congress on Inebriety held at Westminster Town Hall (1887). He was also corresponding secretary of the American Association for the cure of Inebriates, and corresponding member of the Medical Legislation Society, New York.

Alcohol in Medicine
Alcohol was then widely used in medicine. "Dr. Norman Kerr, a well-known physician of England, says, that during a ten years' residence in America, he found people unwilling to pay him as much for his services as they were willing to pay one who prescribed alcoholics. Even those who were abstainers from liquors as beverages distrusted him for not using these things as medicines."

He opposed the medical use of alcohol writing

Testimonial
In 1879 he presided at the medical temperance breakfast to the president, officers and members of the British Medical Association at Cork, and carried the dinner ticket exclusive of wine at the British Medical Association meeting at Cambridge (1880).

A testimonial was held for him in 1880 by members of the temperance movement at the Medical Society of London, which included a carriage, portraits, and an illuminated address.

Wines : scriptural and ecclesiastical
"Wines : scriptural and ecclesiastical" (dedicated to the Archbishop of Canterbury), in which he described the use of unfermented wine for communion, was published following a meeting held in the Chapter House of St Paul's Cathedral in November 1881 by the Church Homiletical Society. A report of one of his lectures on the subject at the Walmer Castle Coffee Tavern recorded that

Society for the Study and Cure of Inebriety
In 1884, in response to the inadequacy of the Habitual Drunkards Act of 1879, he founded the Society for the Study and Cure of Inebriety and was the first president.

He went on to edit and later supervise the Proceedings of the Society until his death.

What was notable at the time was his insistence that inebriety was a disease.

The Inebriates Act
A Parliamentary Inquiry was held in 1889–1890 into the treatment of inebriates. By 1892 many temperance societies, such as the Church of England Temperance Society, supported compulsory legislation for habitual drunkards.

In 1893 a deputation from the British Medical Association, the Society for the Study of Inebriety, the Homes for Inebriates Association, the British Women's Temperance Association, and other bodies met with the Home Secretary, Mr Asquith, to discuss the compulsory detention of inebriates. The Home Secretary recognised that the 1879 Act only covered the well-to-do and that the only option for others was punishment. "The conclusions and recommendations of that committee have been for some considerable time under my attention, and it is my hope that in the next session of Parliament we shall introduce a Bill which will seek to give effect to the more important of them."

He was interviewed in 1896 by the Daily Mail on his views on the proposed legislation:

The Inebriates Act of 1898, which empowered local authorities to set up State Certified Reformatories to treat habitual drunkards, was the culmination of his work.

Morphinomania
Inebriate originally described a person intoxicated with alcohol, but it later came to include other intoxicating drugs.

Medical Jurisprudence
He was vice-president of the International Congress of Medical jurisprudence. His paper "What Shall We Do With Alcoholic Inebriates Apparently Insane?" was read at the Medico-Legal Congress, New York (1895). In 1889 he wrote in a letter concerning the medical evidence in the Maybrick case that "justice will not be satisfied till Mrs Maybrick receives a free pardon".
He was also a speaker at the After-Care Association, set up in 1879 to facilitate the readmission of convalescents from lunatic asylums into social life.

Vegetarianism
Kerr was an advocate of vegetarianism, at one time entertaining 100 persons from the Marylebone Vestry to a vegetarian meal in the Walmer Castle Coffee Tavern, Marylebone Road, and on another occasion members of the medical profession. He provided a "Penny Supper" consisting of a vegetable stew for about 250 poor people living about Lisson Grove at the Perseverance Temperance Hall, to show "inexpensive and wholesome" food. Kerr promoted vegetarianism in his practice and had been a vegetarian since being a medical student.

Support for Women
He supported the admission of women practitioners to the British Medical Association in 1878 when a motion was proposed to exclude them following the election of Mrs Garrett Anderson and Mrs Dr Hoggan.

It was not until 1892 that women were admitted to the British Medical Association.

Support for Early Closing
He supported in 1881 the Early Closing Movement "limiting the hours of labour in shops to 12 daily", writing that "I have a very strong conviction, on medical grounds, that the present hours during which shop assistants have to work are excessive and prejudicial to health."

Kindness to Animals
In 1895 he was part of a deputation from the Church of England Society for Promoting Kindness to Animals to the Education Office requesting schools to teach "the nature and particular requirements" of animals that children were most familiar with. Representing the Church Sanitary Association as vice-chairman he was part of a deputation asking the County Council to adopt a system of properly supervised public abattoirs "for the good in every way, as well for the cause of kindness to animals as for that of sanitation".

Publications

 Medical aspect of the temperance question, especially upon the action of alcoholic liquors in health. London, Church of England Temperance Society [1875]
 The Action of Alcoholic Liquors in Health. London, [1876]
 Intemperance and its remedy. London, National Temperance Publication Depot [1877]
 Mortality from Intemperance. London, National Temperance Publication Depot [1879]
 Female intemperance.  London, National Temperance Publication Depot [1880]
 The heredity of alcohol : Read at the International Congress for the study of alcoholism, held at Brussels, August 1880. London : National Temperance Publication Depot [1880]
 Stimulants in Workhouses. London, National Temperance Publication Depot [1882]
 Cholera : its prevention and cure, with special reference to alcohol. London, National Temperance Publication Depot [1884]
 Inaugural address. Society for the Study and Cure of Inebriety. London, H.K. Lewis [1884]
 Wines : scriptural and ecclesiastical. London, National Temperance Publication Depot [edition 1 1882, edition 2 1887]
 The Truth about Alcohol. London, H K Lewis [1885]
 Hydrophobia And Its Prevention. The British Medical Journal, vol. 2, no. 1344, 1886, pp. 628–629 [1886].
 Inebriety; its Etiology, Pathology, Treatment and Jurisprudence. London, H.K.Lewis [1888, 1889]
 Does inebriety conduce to longevity? London, H.K. Lewis [1889]
 How to deal with inebriates, in: Report of the III. International Congresses against the Abuse of Spiritual Beverages in Christiania 3–5. Sept. 1890. (Bericht des III. Internationalen Congresses gegen den Missbrauch Geistiger Getränke in Christiania 3–5. Sept. 1890. Hrsg. vom Organisationscomite. Published: Christiania, Mallinske Boktrykkeri, 1891.)
 Inebriety and Criminal Responsibility. [1891]
 Inebriety or Narcomania : Its Etiology, Pathology, Treatment, and Jurisprudence. London, H.K. Lewis [1894]
 Alcoholism and Drug Habits. in Twentieth Century Practice; An International Encyclopedia of Modern Medical Science. Vol III. New York, William Wood & Co [1895]

Personal life
By 1871 he was living at Markyate Street, Bedfordshire (now Hertfordshire), and married Eleanor Georgina Gibson (born 1850, Ballinderry, Ireland) at St Peter's, South Kensington; they had a son and four daughters. From 1874 he lived in Grove Road, (now Lisson Grove) St.John's Wood, London and was employed as the Medical Officer of Health for Marylebone. After the death of his wife in 1892 he was married for a second time in 1894 at Booterstown to Edith Jane Henderson (1851 - 1922), who was vice president of the Women's Total Abstinence Union from 1898 until 1917. From 1896 he lived at Hamilton Terrace, London NW8. He did not retire from his post until the January before his death and "had been ailing for a year past, suffering from Bright's disease and from frequent attacks of bronchitis". Dr Crothers reported that he had developed diabetes.

He died of influenza at Wellington Square, Hastings, England on 30 May 1899 and is buried in the Paddington old cemetery.

The funeral at St Marks Church was taken by Canon Duckworth on Saturday 3 June and attended by his family, including his brother Alexander Kerr and nephews George Murray and Dr Andrew Murray.

His son, Arthur (1872-1933), was ordained an Anglican Priest while his daughters were teachers and never married. His second wife, Edith, died in 1922; she is buried at Bognor Regis Old Cemetery.

Legacy
A mosaic memorial by Salviati of Venice of the Good Samaritan was erected to him in 1901 at St Mark's Church, Hamilton Terrace, London NW8.
The Norman Kerr Memorial Lectures were started in 1905 to commemorate his life and work and continued every second year until 1943.
The Society for the Study and Cure of Inebriety continues today as The Society for the Study of Addiction.
Some of his books are still available today as classic reprints.

References

External links

Inebriety; Or, Narcomania; Its Etiology, Pathology, Treatment, and Jurisprudence (1894)
Society for the Study and Cure of Inebriety : inaugural address delivered in the Medical Society of London's rooms, April 25th, 1884
Wines of the Bible (1885)
Wines: Scriptural and Ecclesiastical (1887)

1834 births
1899 deaths
19th-century Scottish medical doctors
Alcohol and health
Alumni of the University of Glasgow
Deaths from influenza
Fellows of the Linnean Society of London
People educated at Hyndland Secondary School
Medical doctors from Glasgow
People from St John's Wood
Scottish temperance activists
Scottish vegetarianism activists
British social reformers
Burials at Paddington Old Cemetery